Grand Hotel Kathmandu is a hotel in Kathmandu, Nepal, located on Red Cross Road in Tachachal, in the western central part of the city, near Kathmandu Engineering College. It is located in a distinct white and red building and is the tallest hotel in Nepal. The hotel has 91 rooms and 7 suites.

References

External links
Official site

Hotels in Kathmandu
Hotels established in 1999
Hotel buildings completed in 1999
1999 establishments in Nepal